William Tang Sharon (January 9, 1821November 13, 1885) was a United States senator, banker, and business owner from Nevada who profited from the Comstock Lode.

Early life
Sharon was born in Smithfield, Ohio, January 9, 1821, the son of William Sharon and Susan Kirk. He attended Ohio University. After studying law in St. Louis, Missouri, he was admitted to the bar. In addition to practicing law, he engaged in mercantile pursuits in Carrollton, Illinois.

Career in the West

Sharon moved to California in 1849, accompanied by his friend John Douglas Fry (July 1, 1819 – February 3, 1901). Sharon and Fry engaged in business together for a short time in Sacramento. Sharon then moved to San Francisco in 1850, where he dealt in real estate. In 1852, he married Maria Malloy (Quebec, 1832 – San Francisco, May 14, 1875). He moved to Virginia City, Nevada in 1864 as manager of the branch of the Bank of California and became interested in silver mining.

Sharon was a business partner of Darius Mills and William Ralston, as well as the Nevada agent for the Bank of California. The bank profited greatly from loaning money to mining and milling operations and then foreclosing on those operations when the owners defaulted. The Bank of California owned mines as well as reduction mills, which Sharon controlled. In his efforts to monopolize the Comstock mining region, Sharon directed mined ore be sent to this mill or that, and affectively “starved out” competition, i.e. those who had come to the bank for loans. The bank also built and owned the famous Virginia and Truckee Railroad.

William Sharon acquired many of Ralston's assets in 1875 when Ralston's financial empire collapsed and he died. He was thought by some of his contemporaries to have actually aided the collapse. He certainly was the main beneficiary of Ralston's assets. Those assets included the Palace Hotel in San Francisco and Ralston Hall in Belmont, California.

His daughter Clara married Francis G. Newlands, who became a Congressman and Senator from Nevada. He was also the father of Florence Emily Sharon, who married Sir Thomas George Fermor-Hesketh, 7th Baronet. Their son Thomas married Louise (née Tevis) Breckinridge, the daughter of banker Lloyd Tevis and divorced wife of John Witherspoon Breckinridge (a son of former Vice President John C. Breckinridge).

Senator
He was elected as a Republican to the United States Senate from Nevada and served from March 4, 1875 to March 3, 1881.  He served as the chairman of the Committee on Mines and Mining in the 45th United States Congress.

Sharon spent the majority of his term in office living in California, missing more than 90% of votes.

Sharon vs. Sharon  

Sarah Althea Hill was a 30-year-old mentally unstable woman with a history of violent behavior. She carried a small-caliber Colt revolver in her purse and did not hesitate to threaten all who crossed her. She attracted the attention of 60-year-old Sharon. He was at the time reportedly earning over $100,000 per month. He gave her $500 (about $) a month and a room in the San Francisco Grand Hotel, adjoining the Palace Hotel where he lived, and enjoyed her companionship from time to time. After just over a year, he tried to end the relationship, but she would not allow it, and kept inviting herself to his office and sent repeated pleas for him to reconsider his decision. He finally evicted her from her room by having the carpets ripped up and the door hinges removed, along with a $7,500 (around $) payment.

Sued for adultery

When he began a relationship with another woman, she claimed to be his wife and sued him for adultery. One of her attorneys was former Chief Justice of the California Supreme Court  David S. Terry. Sharon countersued, claiming that the marriage contract she produced was fraudulent.

As was the custom at the time, U.S. Supreme Court Associate Justice Stephen J. Field was assigned to assist the California Circuit Court. He was assigned to the Sharon vs. Sharon case. Coincidentally, Fields had in 1859 replaced David Terry on the California Supreme Court after Terry killed California United States Senator David Colbreth Broderick in a duel. Although he was not charged with a crime, he resigned and left the state.

After William Sharon died on November 13, 1885, his son Frederick and son-in-law carried on the case. Hill produced a handwritten will that she said she had found in his desk. Many were suspicious of its authenticity. It gave her all of Sharon's estate. She soon married her attorney Terry.

Forged marriage contract 

In January 1886, a U.S. Circuit Court Judge and a U.S. District Court Judge sitting as a Circuit Judge rendered a decision that the marriage contract was a forgery. The Terrys were jailed when they refused to comply with the Court's order to give the court the marriage contract. They returned to the court in March 1888, seeking further relief. Oral arguments was heard before Justice Stephen J. Field, sitting as Circuit Court Justice, Circuit Court Judge Lorenzo Sawyer, and District Court Judge George Myron Sabin. The Court took the matter under advisement. After the court hearing, Judge Sawyer encountered the Terrys on a train between Fresno and San Francisco on August 14, 1888. When Terry and his wife saw Sawyer on the train, she personally threatened to kill Sawyer.

Will a forgery

On September 3, 1888, Field delivered the final Circuit Court opinion. He ruled that the will was a forgery. Sarah Althea Hill Sharon Terry suddenly stood up, screamed obscenities at the judge, and fumbled in her handbag for her revolver. When Marshal John Franks and others attempted to escort her from the courtroom, attorney Terry rose to defend his wife and went for his Bowie knife. He hit Franks, knocking out a tooth, and the marshals drew their handguns. Spectators subdued Terry and led him out of the courtroom, where he pulled his Bowie knife again and threatened all around him. David Neagle was among the Marshals present and put his pistol in Terry's face.  Both Terrys were subdued and placed under arrest. Justice Field had them returned to the courtroom and sentenced both to jail for contempt of court. David Terry got  six months in jail, and Sarah Terry got one month.

While being transported to jail and while serving their sentences, Terry and his wife repeatedly threatened to kill Judge Field. The Terrys suffered several more setbacks. Both David and Althea were indicted by a federal grand jury on criminal charges arising out of their behavior in the courtroom before Justice Field. In May 1889, the U.S. Supreme Court refused to review the order that invalidated Althea Terry's marriage contract with Senator Sharon. Then, in July, with only one of the four judges who had earlier ruled in their favor, the California Supreme Court reversed itself. It ruled that because Althea Terry and Sharon had kept their alleged marriage a secret, they were never legally married. While in jail or shortly afterward, pregnant Althea suffered a miscarriage.

The newspapers followed the case closely and repeatedly speculated about the likelihood of an attack on Field. When Field returned to California as a circuit riding judge for the 9th Circuit Court again the next year, U.S. Attorney General William Miller instructed Marshal Franks to appoint Neagle as a Marshal with the responsibility to protect Field.

Terry killed

When Terry and Hill were released, they returned to Fresno. On August 14, 1889, they boarded a train in Fresno on which Field and Neagle were returning from Los Angeles. At 7:10 am, all of the passengers disembarked the train to eat breakfast in the railroad station dining room at Lathrop, California. The conductor immediately sent word to Constable Walker that both men were on board and requested that he come at once to the railroad station, but he couldn't be found right away. When Terry saw Field, he slowly came across the dining room and approached Field from the rear. The account in the San Francisco Chronicle the next day reported that Terry slapped Field on his cheek. Other reports said Terry attempted to slap Field, or to grab him by the whiskers.

Neagle, who was 5'7" tall and weighed 145 pounds, testified that the 6'3", 250-pound Terry recognized Neagle from the earlier confrontation in the courtroom. Neagle rose from his chair and said, "Stop that! I am an officer." When Terry drew back his fist to deliver another blow, Neagle shot Terry in the heart at point-blank range with a 45 caliber revolver. As Terry fell backward, Neagle fired again, nicking his ear. Neagle announced to the 80 to 100 people in the dining room, "I am a United States Marshal and I defy anyone to touch me!" Field told them that Terry had assaulted him "and my officer shot him."

Neagle and Field reboarded the train and locked themselves in their cabin. Sarah Terry attempted tried to enter their car, saying she wished to slap Field. Neagle insisted that she be kept out or he would kill her too. The satchel she had fetched from the train was searched and a pistol was found within it. A few minutes later Constable Walker of Lathrop and Stanislaus County Sheriff Purvis arrived. Neagle provided a document issued by the U.S. Attorney General appointing him as a special Marshal to protect Field. Walker arrested Neagle and took him to the county jail in Stockton. Neagle refused to say anything about the shooting. San Joaquin County Sheriff Thomas Cunningham telegrammed San Francisco officers and sought Field's arrest on his arrival in Oakland. This was not done. Judge Fields telegraphed the Marshal's office in Stockton, who relayed the information to the US Attorney General. The United States Attorney in San Francisco filed a writ of habeas corpus for Neagle's release. The circuit court issued the writ after a hearing and ordered Neagle's release.

Federal law supreme 
Sheriff Cunningham, with the aid of the State of California, appealed to the United States Supreme Court. Cunningham's appeal was based on whether Neagle acted in pursuance of the law when he shot Terry. Neagle's defense was based on the letter from Miller to Marshal Franks, which gave him federal authority to act as a law enforcement officer. In 1890, the Supreme Court ruled In re Neagle that federal officers are immune from state prosecution for actions taken within the scope of their federal authority.

Sarah committed

Sarah Terry, widowed by her husband's death, gradually went insane. She wandered  the streets of San Francisco aimlessly, ignoring her appearance. She constantly talked to "spirits," especially that of her husband. She was diagnosed with “dementia praecox,” an early term for schizophrenia. On March 2, 1892, she was found insane and committed at age 42 to the California Asylum at Stockton, where she lived for 45 years until her death.

Sharon was buried in Laurel Hill Cemetery in San Francisco; and his remains were moved to Cypress Lawn Memorial Park in Colma, California.

Legacy
The prolonged legal battle over the Sharon fortune was the inspiration for Eleazar Lipsky's novel The Devil's Daughter (1969).

Notes

References
 Kroninger, Robert. Sarah and the Senator. Berkeley, Calif.: Howell-North, 1964
 Roberts, Gary L. In Pursuit of Duty. American West 7 (September 1970): 27–33, 62-63

 Hudson, Lynne. The Making of Mammy Pleasant: A Black Entrepreneur in Nineteenth Century San Francisco Chicago and Urbana IL.: University of Illinois Press, 2003. (p63)
 Stone, Irving. "Men to Match My Mountains."
 Senator Graham, Pacific Commercial Advertiser, Honolulu, Hawaiian Islands. January 3, 1985.

Further reading

1821 births
1885 deaths
Ohio University alumni
People from Virginia City, Nevada
People from Smithfield, Ohio
Republican Party United States senators from Nevada
Nevada Republicans
California Republicans
19th-century American politicians
People from Carrollton, Illinois
Burials at Cypress Lawn Memorial Park
Burials at Laurel Hill Cemetery (San Francisco)